Amata pseudextensa  is a species of moth of the family Erebidae first described by Walter Rothschild in 1910. It is found on Borneo.

References 

Psuedexten
Moths of Borneo
Moths described in 1910